The SZD-30 Pirat is a single-seat multi-purpose glider aircraft from the Polish firm PZL Bielsko which first flew in 1966 and began to be produced in 1967.

Development
The SZD-30 is of wooden construction. The high-mounted wing incorporates air brakes on both upper and lower surfaces. The inner section of the wing is constant-chord and the outer section is tapered.

The forward section of the otherwise all-wood fuselage is made of fiberglass. The single-wheel main landing gear is fixed. The formed one-piece canopy is side-mounted. The fuselage can be equipped with radios and an oxygen system. There are two baggage compartments.

Variants
SZD-30 - Initial production version
SZD-30B - A single prototype
SZD-30C - Later production version, with smaller partially balanced ailerons of fiberglass and a larger cockpit. The first -30C flew on 10 January. 1978.

Operational limitations
In 2011, following a number of cases of glue failure in the wooden joints leading to structural failure, the type certificate holder issued a bulletin which reduces a number of the limiting speeds of the aircraft. Specifically, the maximum speed (VNE) is reduced to 195 km/h (121 mph, 105 knots) and aerobatic flight is prohibited.

Specifications

See also
List of gliders

References

Sailplane Directory

SZD30
1960s Polish sailplanes
SZD aircraft
Aircraft first flown in 1966
T-tail aircraft
High-wing aircraft